Lambdaconus is a genus of proterotheriid from the Late Oligocene to Early Miocene of Argentina. The type species is L. suinus, named in 1897 by Ameghino, with referred species including L. lacerum, named as Proterotherium lacerum in 1902 by Ameghino, and L. inaqeuifacies.

References

Proterotheriids
Oligocene mammals of South America
Miocene mammals of South America
Paleogene Argentina
Neogene Argentina
Fossils of Argentina
Colhuehuapian
Deseadan
Fossil taxa described in 1897
Taxa named by Florentino Ameghino
Prehistoric placental genera
Golfo San Jorge Basin
Sarmiento Formation